Robert Joseph Sykes (born December 11, 1954) is an American former professional baseball pitcher. He played during five seasons in Major League Baseball (MLB) for the Detroit Tigers and St. Louis Cardinals.

Sykes was drafted by the Tigers in the 19th round of the 1974 MLB draft. He played his first professional season with their Rookie level Bristol Tigers in 1974. Rarely a starter for most of his career, Sykes was moved to the bullpen for the majority of his final major league season with the Cardinals in 1981. He split his last season between the New York Yankees' Double-A Nashville Sounds and Triple-A Columbus Clippers in 1982 after being traded from St. Louis for Willie McGee on October 21, 1981.

References

External links

1954 births
Living people
Major League Baseball pitchers
Detroit Tigers players
St. Louis Cardinals players
Baseball players from New Jersey
Miami Dade Sharks baseball players
People from Neptune Township, New Jersey
Sportspeople from Monmouth County, New Jersey
Bristol Tigers players
Columbus Clippers players
Evansville Triplets players
Montgomery Rebels players
Nashville Sounds players
Springfield Redbirds players
St. Petersburg Cardinals players